Marshall is a town in Washington Township, Parke County, in the U.S. state of Indiana. As of the 2010 census, the population was 324.

History 
A post office has been in operation at Marshall since 1878. The town was named for Mahlon W. Marshall, an original owner of the town site.

The Arch in the Town of Marshall was listed on the National Register of Historic Places in 1985.

Geography 
Marshall is located at  (39.846801, -87.187237).

Demographics

2010 census 
As of the census of 2010, there were 324 people, 121 households, and 90 families living in the town. The racial makeup of the town was 98.5% White, 1.2% Native American, and 0.3% from other races. Hispanic or Latino of any race were 1.2% of the population.

There were 121 households, of which 34.7% had children under the age of 18 living with them, 57.0% were married couples living together, 12.4% had a female householder with no husband present, 5.0% had a male householder with no wife present, and 25.6% were non-families. 19.0% of all households were made up of individuals, and 7.5% had someone living alone who was 65 years of age or older. The average household size was 2.68 and the average family size was 3.06.

The median age in the town was 39.6 years. 23.8% of residents were under the age of 18; 10.4% were between the ages of 18 and 24; 23.1% were from 25 to 44; 29.9% were from 45 to 64; and 12.7% were 65 years of age or older. The gender makeup of the town was 46.9% male and 53.1% female.

2000 census 
As of the census of 2000, there were 360 people, 131 households, and 96 families living in the town. The racial makeup of the town was 99.17% White and 0.83% from two or more races.

There were 131 households, out of which 39.7% had children under the age of 18 living with them, 60.3% were married couples living together, 13.0% had a female householder with no husband present, and 26.0% were non-families. 22.9% of all households were made up of individuals, and 10.7% had someone living alone who was 65 years of age or older. The average household size was 2.75 and the average family size was 3.26.

In the town, the population was spread out, with 33.1% under the age of 18, 8.9% from 18 to 24, 27.2% from 25 to 44, 18.6% from 45 to 64, and 12.2% who were 65 years of age or older. The median age was 30 years. For every 100 females, there were 102.2 males. For every 100 females age 18 and over, there were 91.3 males.

The median income for a household in the town was $33,906, and the median income for a family was $36,042. Males had a median income of $30,417 versus $22,292 for females. The per capita income for the town was $12,889. About 8.4% of families and 16.7% of the population were below the poverty line, including 26.2% of those under age 18 and 2.5% of those age 65 or over.

References 

Towns in Parke County, Indiana
Towns in Indiana